Ganesa nitidiuscula is a species of sea snail, a marine gastropod mollusk in the family Skeneidae.

Description
The diameter of the shell is 3.1 mm. The shell is rimate, opaque, and rather glossy. It shows remote, flexuous growth striae. The sharp peristome is simple and is interrupted by the parietal wall.

Distribution
This species occurs in the North Sea between the Hebrides and the Faroe Islands.

References

 Gofas, S.; Le Renard, J.; Bouchet, P. (2001). Mollusca, in: Costello, M.J. et al. (Ed.) (2001). European register of marine species: a check-list of the marine species in Europe and a bibliography of guides to their identification. Collection Patrimoines Naturels, 50: pp. 180–213

nitidiuscula
Gastropods described in 1883